Benjamin Lorenza Wilkerson (born November 22, 1982) is an American football coach and former player who is the assistant offensive line coach for the New York Jets of the National Football League (NFL).  He played center in the NFL for four seasons during the early 2000s and college football for LSU, earning consensus All-American honors, and was recognized as the top college football center.  He signed with the NFL's Cincinnati Bengals as an undrafted free agent, and also played for the NFL's Atlanta Falcons and the Florida Tuskers of the United Football League (UFL).

Early years
Wilkerson was born in Port Arthur, Texas.  He graduated from Hemphill High School in Hemphill, Texas.

College career
He received an athletic scholarship to attend Louisiana State University, where he played for coach Nick Saban's LSU Tigers football team from 2001 to 2004.  As a junior in 2003, he was a member of the Tigers' SEC Championship team that defeated the Oklahoma Sooners 21–14 to win the BCS National Championship.  Following his senior 2004 season, he was recognized as a first-team All-Southeastern Conference (SEC) selection and a consensus first-team All-American, and was awarded the Rimington Trophy as the best college football center in the country.

Professional career

He was a member of the United Football League's Florida Tuskers for part of the 2009 season.

Coaching career

LSU
Wilkerson served as a graduate assistant for the LSU Tigers during the 2011 football season under Les Miles.

Grambling State
He served as the offensive line coach at Grambling State University from 2012–2013.

North Shore Senior High School
Wilkerson was a PE teacher and assistant football and track coach at North Shore Senior High School in Texas during 2014.

Chicago Bears
On February 11, 2015, Wilkerson was hired by the Chicago Bears as their assistant offensive line coach.

New York Giants
On February 5, 2018, the New York Giants hired Wilkerson to serve as their assistant offensive line coach.
Even with the coaching change in 2020, head coach Joe Judge decided to keep Wilkerson on the Giants staff in the same position. Wilkerson coached the team's offensive line when Dave DeGuglielmo missed their week 17 game against the Dallas Cowboys on January 3, 2021. He was not retained after the 2021 season.

New York Jets
Wilkerson was hired on March 7, 2022, by the New York Jets to be their assistant offensive line coach.

Personal life
Wilkerson and his wife, Angi, have four children, Brianna, Isabella, Jordan, and Benjamin ll.

References

1982 births
Living people
African-American coaches of American football
African-American players of American football
All-American college football players
American football centers
Atlanta Falcons players
Chicago Bears coaches
Cincinnati Bengals players
Florida Tuskers players
LSU Tigers football coaches
LSU Tigers football players
New York Giants coaches
Players of American football from Texas
Sportspeople from Port Arthur, Texas
21st-century African-American sportspeople
20th-century African-American people